The 2005–06 season was Stade Malherbe Caen's 92nd season in existence and the club's first season back in the second division of French football. In addition to the domestic league, Caen participated in this season's editions of the Coupe de France, and the Coupe de la Ligue.

Competitions

Overall record

Ligue 2

League table

Results summary

Results by round

Matches

Coupe de France

Coupe de la Ligue

References

Caen
Stade Malherbe Caen seasons